St. Vincent de Paul Church in San Francisco, California, is a Roman Catholic parish situated in Cow Hollow, located at 2320 Green St. (at Steiner).

History 
The parish was formed by Archbishop Patrick W. Riordan on August 24, 1901. The first Mass was offered in a storefront hall on Fillmore Street on September 22, 1901 by Father Martin Ryan, the first Pastor. In 1902 the rectory and a one-story church over a hall was built at the present site at Green and Steiner. Both structures survived the earthquake of 1906. In 1911, work began on the superstructure, which is the present church.

Today, the church serves approximately 2400 individuals and families that call it their parish and one of the most active Catholic Young Adults Groups in the Archdiocese of San Francisco and greater California.

Notable people
Nancy Pelosi, longtime parishioner and politician

References

Roman Catholic churches in California
Christian organizations established in 1901
Roman Catholic churches completed in 1911
Roman Catholic churches in San Francisco
Vincent de Paul Church
20th-century Roman Catholic church buildings in the United States